David C. Bote (born April 7, 1993) is an American professional baseball infielder in the Chicago Cubs organization. He made his MLB debut in 2018.

Amateur career
Bote attended Erie High School in Erie, Colorado as a freshman and later transferred to Faith Christian Academy in Arvada, Colorado. As a senior in 2011, Bote led Faith Christian to the 3A Colorado state title in baseball. Bote enrolled at Liberty University to play college baseball as a walk-on, but after a semester, transferred to Neosho County Community College in Kansas. During his lone collegiate season, he hit .419.

Professional career
The Chicago Cubs selected Bote in the 18th round, with the 554th overall selection, of the 2012 Major League Baseball draft. After Bote signed with the Cubs for $100,000 plus college tuition, he was assigned to the Arizona League Cubs where he batted .232 with one home run, 14 RBIs and seven doubles in 38 games. He spent 2013 with the Daytona Cubs, Kane County Cougars, and Boise Hawks, posting a combined .227 batting average with seven home runs and 38 RBIs in 90 total games between the three teams, and 2014 with Kane County, Boise, and the Iowa Cubs, compiling a combined .235 batting average with four home runs and 40 RBIs in 99 games. In 2015, he played for the South Bend Cubs where he slashed .251/.328/384 with six home runs and 41 RBIs, and in 2016, he spent time with Iowa, the Tennessee Smokies, and the Myrtle Beach Pelicans, batting a combined .328 with seven home runs and 45 RBIs with an .892 OPS.

In 2017, Bote played for the Tennessee Smokies where he was named a Southern League All-Star. After the season, he played in the Arizona Fall League and was selected to play in the Fall Stars Game. The Cubs added him to their 40-man roster after the season. In the minor leagues, Bote had played at every position except catcher.

Bote made his major league debut on April 21, 2018, taking the place of Ben Zobrist who was placed on the disabled list. Bote filled in for a week at third for an injured Kris Bryant. He had 19 at bats with five hits, five RBIs, one stolen base and a batting average of .263 before being sent back to the Iowa Cubs. On July 26, 2018, Bote hit a game-tying, two-run home run with one out in the bottom of the ninth inning against Arizona Diamondbacks pitcher Brad Boxberger, which was immediately followed by a walk-off solo home run by teammate Anthony Rizzo. On August 12, 2018, Bote hit a pinch hit, two-out, two-strike walk-off grand slam off Washington Nationals pitcher Ryan Madson to give his team a one-run victory, which had not been done since Roger Freed in 1979, giving the Cubs a 4–3 victory and a two-out-of-three series win, marking the second time in Major League Baseball history that a player hit a walk-off grand slam to win by a score of 4–3. On August 24, 2018, Bote hit his 2nd career walk-off home run off Cincinnati Reds pitcher Raisel Iglesias. The Cubs won that game 3–2.

On April 3, 2019, Bote signed a five-year, $15 million extension with the Cubs. He recorded his third walk-off hit, a single off of Arizona Diamondbacks pitcher Archie Bradley on April 21, 2019. On June 5, Bote had a four-hit, seven RBI game in a 9–8 win against the Colorado Rockies. He finished the 2019 season slashing .257/.362/.422 with 11 home runs and 41 RBIs over 127 games.

In the pandemic-shortened 2020 season, Bote slashed .200/.303/.408 with seven home runs and 29 RBIs in 45 games. In 2021, Bote limped to a .199/.276/.330 batting line with eight home runs and 35 RBIs in 97 games. In November 2021, following the season, Bote underwent left shoulder surgery, with an expected recovery time of six months.

Bote began the 2022 season on the 60-day injured list as he recovered from shoulder surgery, and was activated on June 24. The Cubs optioned Bote to Iowa on August 4. He was sent outright off the 40-man roster on November 10, 2022.

Personal life
Bote is married to Rachel Bote, his high school sweetheart. The married couple have three children. Bote is a Born-again Christian. Bote initially wanted to become a pastor after high school. He grew up a Colorado Rockies fan.

References

External links

1993 births
Living people
People from Longmont, Colorado
Baseball players from Colorado
Major League Baseball infielders
Chicago Cubs players
Neosho County Panthers baseball players
Arizona League Cubs players
Boise Hawks players
Kane County Cougars players
Daytona Cubs players
Iowa Cubs players
South Bend Cubs players
Myrtle Beach Pelicans players
Tennessee Smokies players
Mesa Solar Sox players